Cheryl Elaine Burnett (born June 13, 1958) is an American former women's college basketball coach and player. She was the head coach of the Southwest Missouri State women's basketball team from 1987 to 2002.  At Southwest Missouri State, she compiled a 319–136 record and led her teams to the Final Four of the NCAA tournament in 1992 and 2001. She also served as the head coach of the Michigan Wolverines women's basketball team from 2003 to 2007, compiling a record of 35–83.  She played college basketball at the University of Kansas from 1976 to 1980.

Playing career
Burnett is a native of Centralia, Missouri. She played basketball at Centralia High School where she was selected as an All-American during her senior year.

Burnett received a scholarship to play basketball at the University of Kansas. She was the first woman to receive a full athletic scholarship to that university.  She was a starter at the guard position for the Kansas Jayhawks women's basketball team for all four years from 1976 to 1980.  In 1977, she was selected as a Big Eight Conference All-Tournament player.

Kansas statistics

Coaching career

Early years
Burnett was drafted to play professional basketball by the New Jersey Gems of the Women's Professional Basketball League.  She opted instead to pursue a career in coaching.  In 1980, after graduating from Kansas, Burnett began her coaching career as an assistant girls' basketball coach at Lawrence High School in Lawrence, Kansas.  In August 1981, she was hired as an assistant coach for the University of Illinois women's basketball team.

Southwest Missouri State
In 1984, Burnett was hired as an assistant coach of the Southwest Missouri State women's basketball team in Springfield, Missouri.  She became the head coach in 1987 and held that post for 15 years from 1987 to 2002.  Her teams won nine Missouri Valley Conference championships, received invitations to the NCAA Division I women's basketball tournament 10 times, and advanced to the Final Four in 1992 and 2001.  She compiled an overall record of 319–136 at Southwest Missouri State. Players recruited and developed by Burnett include Jackie Stiles who set the NCAA career scoring record with 3,393 points. In April 2002, Burnett resigned her post at Southwest Missouri State, indicating that she intended to look for another job.

University of Michigan
In December 2003, Burnett was hired by the University of Michigan as the head coach of the Michigan Wolverines women's basketball team.  In four seasons at Michigan, Burnett compiled an overall record of 35–83 and a record of 10–54 against Big Ten Conference opponents.  Her teams lost 20 or more games in her last three seasons at Michigan and finished in last place in the Big Ten in 2005 and 2006 and in 10th place in 2007.  She retired as Michigan's head coach in March 2007.

Honors
In February 2003, Burnett was inducted into the Southwest Missouri State Hall of Fame.  In October 2009, she was also inducted into Missouri Valley Conference Hall of Fame.

Head coaching record

References 

1958 births
Living people
American women's basketball coaches
Basketball coaches from Missouri
Basketball players from Missouri
Michigan Wolverines women's basketball coaches
Kansas Jayhawks women's basketball players
Missouri State Lady Bears basketball coaches
People from Centralia, Missouri